H.I.T. is the name of a soundtrack in 2007 for the MBC drama H.I.T. (히트), which stands for Homicide Investigation Unit.

The Super Junior members featured in this soundtrack are Yesung, Kang-in, Sungmin, Donghae, Ryeowook, and Kyuhyun.

Track listing
 Success - Super Junior
 통증 - Gummy (거미)
 그 사람 - JM
 마지막 사랑 - Kim Jung Min (김정민)
 그댈 위한 이별 - Lee Joon Kyung (이준경)
 H.I.T. - Super Junior
 H.I.T & Run
 Human nature
 Delightful Love
 Instinct
 Suorrowful Love
 Urban Shock
 So What
 In A Heartbeat
 Shotgun
 Stormy Day
 Arrest

External links
  MBC's Official Site

Soundtracks by South Korean artists
2007 soundtrack albums
Television soundtracks